Émile Knecht (18 December 1923 – 4 May 2019) was a Swiss rower who competed in the 1948 Summer Olympics and in the 1952 Summer Olympics. In 1948 he was a crew member of the Swiss boat which won the silver medal in the coxed fours event. Four years later he was eliminated with his partner Peter Stebler in the first round repêchage of the double sculls event.

References

External links 
 
 

1923 births
2019 deaths
Swiss male rowers
Olympic rowers of Switzerland
Rowers at the 1948 Summer Olympics
Rowers at the 1952 Summer Olympics
Olympic silver medalists for Switzerland
Olympic medalists in rowing
Medalists at the 1948 Summer Olympics
European Rowing Championships medalists
20th-century Swiss people